Thomas Gagliano (born Tommaso Gagliano; ; May 29, 1883 − February 16, 1951) was an Italian-American mobster and boss of what U.S. federal authorities would later designate as the Lucchese crime family, one of the "Five Families" of New York City. He was a low-profile boss for over two decades. His successor was his longtime loyalist and underboss, Tommy Lucchese.

Early life
Gagliano was born on May 29, 1883, in Corleone, Sicily. In 1905 he immigrated to the United States, in New York City, and married Giuseppina "Josephine" Pomilla, who was also from Corleone. Gagliano and his brother-in-law Nunzio Pomilla were partners in lathing and hoisting companies in the Bronx. He was underboss to Gaetano "Tom" Reina until he became the boss of the family in 1930. The Reina family controlled a monopoly on ice distribution in the Bronx. Gagliano along with Gaetano "Tommy" Lucchese and Stefano "Steve" Rondelli were viewed as the most powerful members of the Reina family.

Frank Gagliano was a distant relative of Tommy Gagliano and the son of a deported mobster. He was also the cousin of mob boss Thomas Eboli's chauffeur and bodyguard, future Genovese crime family underboss Dominick Alongi who would later achieve notoriety when they were among the many mobsters arrested fleeing the famous 1957 Apalachin Meeting. He was a blood relative of mobster Joseph (Pip the Blind) Gagliano, who became a childhood friend and early accomplice of future government witness Joseph Valachi. The two performed many burglaries and armed robberies together.

Castellammarese War
During the late 1920s, a bitter gang rivalry arose in New York between Joseph "the Boss" Masseria, the most powerful mobster in New York, and Salvatore Maranzano, head of the Castellammarese Sicilian clan. Masseria had demanded more money from Reina, prompting Reina to consider switching allegiance to Maranzano. When Masseria heard about Reina's plans, Masseria murdered him in February 1930. To head Reina's gang, Masseria appointed one of his loyalists, Joseph Pinzolo. Both Gagliano and Lucchese hated Pinzolo and resented Masseria appointing an outsider as gang leader. In September 1930, Pinzolo was shot and killed by unknown assailants. To replace Pinzolo, Masseria appointed Gagliano as head of the Reina gang. It is speculated that Gagliano and Lucchese formed a secret alliance with Maranzano at this time while still professing loyalty to Masseria.

As the war continued, Masseria began suffering more defeats and key defections. On April 15, 1931, Masseria was assassinated at Brooklyn restaurant by several of his men. These defectors, guided by Charles "Lucky" Luciano, had made a deal with Maranzano guaranteeing their power if they switched sides. However, after Masseria's death, Maranzano started promoting himself as the "Boss of All Bosses" for all the Italian-American criminal gangs in the country. Feeling betrayed and threatened, Luciano arranged Maranzano's assassination a few months later in September 1931. During this period of instability, Gagliano remained in control of the Reina gang.

Cosa Nostra families
After Maranzano's death, Luciano restructured all the Italian-American criminal gangs into several crime families regulated by a commission of family bosses. The aim of this restructuring was to settle disputes without bloody gang wars. The New York City gangs were divided into five crime families. Gagliano took over the old Reina family, with Lucchese as his underboss. As a boss, Gagliano became a member of the commission.

Gagliano steered the family through a period of high tension between the Five Families. In 1936, Luciano was sent to prison and then, in 1946, deported to Italy. With Luciano's absence, power on the commission was held by an alliance of bosses Vincent Mangano, Joe Bonanno, Stefano Magaddino and Joe Profaci. Gagliano had to be very careful in the face of this alliance, and was keen to keep a low profile while furthering the business interests of his section of Cosa Nostra, in industries such as gasoline rationing, meat and black market sugar. He usually issued his orders through his close allies, particularly Lucchese, who served as the family's public face and de facto street boss. As a result, very little is known about Gagliano between 1932 and his death from natural causes in the 1950s.

In 1932, Gagliano was convicted of tax evasion and sentenced to 15 months in the Atlanta Penitentiary.

Death
The actual date of Gagliano's death is uncertain. In 1951, Lucchese stated during the Senate hearings on organized crime that Gagliano died on February 16, 1951. 

Tommy Gagliano is interred in a private mausoleum at Woodlawn Cemetery, Bronx, New York.

Notes

References

External links

Lucchese Crime Family Epic: Descent into Darkness

 

1883 births
1951 deaths
American crime bosses
American gangsters of Italian descent
American gangsters of Sicilian descent
Bosses of the Lucchese crime family
Burials at Woodlawn Cemetery (Bronx, New York)
Criminals from New York City
Italian crime bosses
Gangsters from Corleone
Italian emigrants to the United States
Lucchese crime family
People from New York City
Prohibition-era gangsters